Camrose/Marek Farms Aerodrome  is located  east of Marek Farms, Alberta, Canada.

References

Registered aerodromes in Alberta
Camrose County